Two Venetian Ladies is an oil on panel painting by the Italian Renaissance artist Vittore Carpaccio.

The painting, believed to be a quarter of the original work, was executed around 1490 and  shows two unknown Venetian ladies.  The top portion of the panel, called Hunting on the Lagoon is in the Getty Museum, and another matching panel is missing. The painting was formerly  considered to show two courtesans. Modern art historians think them more likely members to be of the patrician Torella family, as suggested by their fine clothes and the pearl necklaces, but academic debate continues, as with other similar Venetian paintings of the period. Several objects - the white kerchief, the pearls and the animals (the doves, Venus's bird) are symbols of chastity. Note the chopines, or platform clogs, on the left. 

Another painted panel, now in the Getty Museum , was published in 1944, and it was later realized that this is part of the same work, fitting above this part: it portrays several boats in a lagoon, and would explain the meaning of the scene, as two women awaiting their husbands' return after an expedition hunting, or fishing with cormorants, in the Venetian lagoon.  This discovery was verified by an in depth technical analysis, comparing the two fragmentary panels.  Another panel the same size as these two combined would have been on the left; probably the two were hinged together to make a diptych, or a folding door or shutter.  The Getty panel has an illusionistic letter rack painted on the back of the panel, which was presumably matched on this panel.  This appears to be the earliest small-scale trompe-l'œil painting since antiquity.

References

Fishing with cormorants: a note on Vittore Carpaccio's Hunting on the lagoon
Getty video on how the two panels fitted together
Page at artonline.it 

1490s paintings
Paintings by Vittore Carpaccio
Collections of the Museo Correr
Birds in art
Dogs in art
Venice in art
Trompe-l'œil paintings